The 42nd Annual American Music Awards ceremony was held on November 23, 2014, at the Nokia Theatre L.A. Live in Los Angeles, California. The awards recognized the most popular artists and albums of 2014. Iggy Azalea led the nominees with six categories.
It was broadcast live on ABC. Pitbull was announced as a host on October 20, 2014. NSYNC's Lance Bass, Chelsea Briggs, Kandi Burruss, Gavin DeGraw, Frankie Grande, Taryn Manning, Jordin Sparks, Morgan Stewart and Ted Stryker were all announced co-hosts of the pre-show on November 7, 2014.

The special received 11.61 million viewers, the fourth-most that night.

Performances

Notes
  Broadcast live from Garth Brooks' concert in Greensboro, NC.

Presenters

Diana Ross
Tracee Ellis Ross
Patrick Dempsey
Ansel Elgort
Rita Ora
Matthew Morrison
Jamie Foxx
Annalise Estelle Foxx
Becky G
Gavin DeGraw
Lauren Cohan
Danai Gurira
Pat Monahan
Kate Beckinsale
Mark Cuban
Robert Herjavec
Anthony Anderson
Kendall Jenner
Kylie Jenner
Khloe Kardashian
Luke Bryan
Uzo Aduba
Dianna Agron
Nathan Fillion
Taylor Schilling
Elizabeth Banks
Aloe Blacc
Jhené Aiko
Meghan Trainor
Julianne Hough
Daymond John
Kevin O'Leary
Jessie J
Heidi Klum
Olivia Munn
Kira Kazantsev
Emmy Rossum
Pentatonix
T.I.
Donnie Wahlberg
Jenny McCarthy
Lucy Hale
Danica McKellar
Brantley Gilbert
Mary Lambert
Josh Duhamel
Ella Henderson

Winners and nominees
The nominations were announced on October 13, 2014, by Jason Derulo and Charli XCX.

References

2014 music awards
2014
2014 awards in the United States
2014 in Los Angeles
November 2014 events in the United States